Branko Pleša (6 March 1926 – 9 June 2001) was a Serbian actor and theatre director. He appeared in more than eighty films from 1949 to 1998.

Filmography

References

External links

1926 births
2001 deaths
Serbs of Bosnia and Herzegovina
Serbian male film actors
Laureates of the Ring of Dobrica